Stephen James Moran (born on 10 January 1961) is a former professional footballer who played as a striker for Southampton during the 1980s. Moran was one of the finest strikers that Southampton has possessed. He had a knack of scoring some crucial goals for the club and had a fine understanding with midfielders Steve Williams and David Armstrong.

Career
Moran attended Prices School in Fareham and appeared regularly for his school team, where he was spotted by scouts. He signed for Southampton in August 1979 and made his debut as a substitute in a 4–1 home win against Manchester City in January 1980, scoring with his very first touch of the ball.

In the 1980–81 season, Moran scored 18 goals in 30 starts in the league, and in 1982 he was voted PFA Young Player of the Year.

Among the 99 goals that Moran scored for the Saints were a hat-trick in an 8–2 victory over Coventry City at The Dell in April 1984, during the club's most successful ever league season, when they finished as runners-up to Liverpool. In the same year, Moran scored an injury-time winner in the 4th Round of the FA Cup, away to arch rivals Portsmouth. David Armstrong crossed from the right and Moran arrived at the back post to volley left-footed past the Portsmouth goalkeeper, Alan Knight.

Moran made 228 senior appearances for Southampton, including playing for them in the UEFA Cup. He was also capped twice for the England under-21 team. But he suffered from a recurring back injury and despite the promise of his early career, never represented England at senior level.

In 1986–87 he joined Leicester City for a transfer fee of £300,000, although at the end of the season they were relegated to Football League Division Two. During the following season he moved to Reading and he went on to make 144 senior appearances for them. For the 1991–92 season he moved on to Exeter City and after 74 senior appearances he transferred to Hull City for 1993–94.

Post-football career
Since retiring from football, Moran has worked for an internet company and as a lorry driver for David Watson Transport Ltd, based in Yorkshire.

References
 Career Stats at oncloudseven

1961 births
Living people
Footballers from Croydon
English footballers
England under-21 international footballers
English Football League players
Southampton F.C. players
Leicester City F.C. players
Reading F.C. players
Exeter City F.C. players
Hull City A.F.C. players
Association football forwards